Peliostomum is a genus of flowering plants belonging to the family Scrophulariaceae.

Its native range is Southern Africa.

Species
Species:

Peliostomum calycinum 
Peliostomum junceum 
Peliostomum leucorrhizum 
Peliostomum origanoides 
Peliostomum virgatum 
Peliostomum viscosum

References

Scrophulariaceae
Scrophulariaceae genera